Acronicta perblanda is a moth of the family Noctuidae. It is found from Carteret County, North Carolina and Stoddard County, Missouri to northern Florida to southern Louisiana.

Adults are on wing from March to April. There is probably one generation per year.

External links
Images
 Acronicta perblanda in Louisiana

Acronicta
Moths of North America
Moths described in 1989